Jean Todrani (1922-2006) was a French poet and translator. He was the founder of Manteia, a literary journal.

Early life
Jean Todrani was born on 19 September 1922 in Marseille, France.

Career
Todrani published poetry in Les Cahiers du Sud, a literary review based in Marseille, from 1948 to 1966. He also published poetry in Cahiers GLM, another literary review.

Todrani was the founder of Manteia, a literary journal.

Death
Todrani died on 14 July 2006.

References

1922 births
2006 deaths
Writers from Marseille
Italian–French translators
Portuguese–French translators
20th-century French poets
20th-century French translators